Sir Edward Richard George Heath  (9 July 191617 July 2005), often known as Ted Heath, was a British politician who served as Prime Minister of the United Kingdom from 1970 to 1974 and Leader of the Conservative Party from 1965 to 1975. Heath also served for 51 years as a Member of Parliament from 1950 to 2001. Outside politics, Heath was a yachtsman, a musician, and an author.

Born to a lady's maid and a carpenter, Heath was educated at a grammar school in Ramsgate, Kent (Chatham House Grammar School for boys) and became a leader within student politics while studying at the University of Oxford. He served as an officer in the Royal Artillery during the Second World War. He worked briefly in the Civil Service, but resigned in order to stand for Parliament, and was elected for Bexley at the 1950 election. He was promoted to become Chief Whip by Anthony Eden in 1955, and in 1959 was appointed to the Cabinet by Harold Macmillan as Minister of Labour. He later held the role of Lord Privy Seal and in 1963, was made President of the Board of Trade by Alec Douglas-Home. After the Conservatives were defeated at the 1964 election, Heath was elected as Leader of the Conservative Party in 1965, becoming Leader of the Opposition. Although he led the Conservatives to a landslide defeat at the 1966 election, he remained in the leadership, and at the 1970 election led his party to an unexpected victory.

During his time as prime minister, Heath oversaw the decimalisation of British coinage in 1971, and in 1972 he led the reformation of local government in the United Kingdom, significantly reducing the number of local authorities and creating several new metropolitan counties, much of which remains to this day. Perhaps Heath's most prominent achievement came in 1973, when he led the United Kingdom into membership of the European Communities popularly known as entry to the Common Market (which would later become the European Union) as a member state. Heath had always been a strong supporter of British membership of the EC, and after winning the decisive vote in the House of Commons by 356 to 244 to join, he led the negotiations that culminated in the UK's entry into the EC on 1 January 1973. According to biographer John Campbell, Heath regarded this as his personal "finest hour".

Heath's time as prime minister also coincided with the height of the Troubles in Northern Ireland, with his approval of internment without trial and subsequent suspension of the Stormont Parliament seeing the imposition of direct British rule. Unofficial talks with Provisional Irish Republican Army delegates were unsuccessful, as was the Sunningdale Agreement of 1973, which led the MPs of the Ulster Unionist Party to withdraw from the Conservative whip. Heath also tried to reform British trade unionism with the Industrial Relations Act, and hoped to deregulate the economy and make a transfer from direct to indirect taxation. However, a miners' strike at the start of 1974 severely damaged the Government, causing the implementation of the Three-Day Week to conserve energy. Attempting to resolve the situation, Heath called an election for February 1974, attempting to obtain a mandate to face down the miners' wage demands, but this instead resulted in a hung parliament, with the Conservatives losing their majority. Despite gaining fewer votes, the Labour Party won four more seats, and Heath resigned as Prime Minister on 4 March after talks with the Liberal Party to form a coalition government were unsuccessful.

After losing a second successive election in October 1974, Heath insisted he would continue as leader, but in January 1975, Margaret Thatcher announced she would challenge Heath for the leadership, and on 4 February, she narrowly outpolled him in the first round. Heath chose to resign the leadership rather than contest the second round. Heath returned to the backbenches, where he would remain until 2001. In 1975, he played a major role in the referendum on British membership of the EC, campaigning for the eventually successful "Yes" vote to remain in the Community. Heath would later become an embittered critic of Thatcher during her time as prime minister, speaking and writing against the policies of Thatcherism. Following the 1992 election, he became Father of the House, until his retirement from the Commons in 2001. He died in 2005, aged 89. 

Heath is one of four British prime ministers never to have married. He has been described by the BBC as "the first working-class meritocrat" to become Conservative leader in "the party's modern history" and "a One Nation Tory in the Disraeli tradition who rejected the laissez-faire capitalism that Thatcher would enthusiastically endorse."

Early life
Heath was born at 54 Albion Road, Broadstairs, Kent, on 9 July 1916, the son of William George Heath (1888–1976), a carpenter who built airframes for Vickers during the First World War, and was subsequently employed as a builder and Edith Anne Heath (née Pantony; 1888–1951), a lady's maid. His father was later a successful small businessman after taking over a building and decorating firm. Heath's paternal grandfather had run a small dairy business, and when that failed worked as a porter at Broadstairs Station on the Southern Railway. Edward was four years old when his younger brother, John, was born; there was no question that Edward was the "favoured brother". Heath was known as "Teddy" as a young man. He was educated at Chatham House Grammar School in Ramsgate, and in 1935 with the aid of a county scholarship he went up to study at Balliol College, Oxford.

In later years, Heath's peculiar accent, with its "strangulated" vowel sounds, combined with his non-Standard pronunciation of "l" as "w" and "out" as "eout", was satirised by Monty Python in the audio sketch "Teach Yourself Heath" (released on a 7" flexi-disc single included with initial copies of their 1972 LP Monty Python's Previous Record). Heath's biographer John Campbell speculates that his speech, unlike that of his father and younger brother, who both spoke with Kent accents, must have undergone "drastic alteration on encountering Oxford", although retaining elements of Kent speech.

Oxford
A talented musician, Heath won the college's organ scholarship in his first term (he had previously tried for the organ scholarships at St Catharine's College, Cambridge, and Keble College, Oxford) which enabled him to stay at the university for a fourth year; he eventually graduated with a Second Class Honours BA in Philosophy, Politics and Economics in 1939.

While at university Heath became active in Conservative Party politics. On the key political issue of the day, foreign policy, he opposed the Conservative-dominated government of the day ever more openly. His first Paper Speech (i.e. a major speech listed on the Order Paper along with the visiting guest speakers) at the Oxford Union, in 1936, was in opposition to the appeasement of Germany by returning her colonies, confiscated during the First World War.

In June 1937 he was elected President of the Oxford University Conservative Association as a pro-Spanish Republic candidate, in opposition to the pro-Franco John Stokes (himself later a Conservative MP). In 1937–38 Heath was chairman of the national Federation of University Conservative Associations, and in the same year (his third at university) he was Secretary and then Librarian of the Oxford Union. At the end of the year he was defeated for the Presidency of the Oxford Union by another Balliol candidate, Alan Wood, on the issue of whether the Chamberlain government should give way to a left-wing Popular Front. On that occasion, Heath supported the government.

In his final year Heath was President of Balliol College Junior Common Room, an office held in subsequent years by his near-contemporaries Denis Healey, who would become a lifelong friend and political rival and Roy Jenkins, and as such was invited to support the Master of Balliol Alexander Lindsay, who stood as an anti-appeasement 'Independent Progressive' candidate against the official Conservative candidate, Quintin Hogg, in the 1938 Oxford by-election.

Heath, who had himself applied to be the Conservative candidate for the by-election, accused the government in an October Union Debate of "turning all four cheeks" to Adolf Hitler, and was elected as President of the Oxford Union in November 1938, sponsored by Balliol, after winning the Presidential Debate that "This House has No Confidence in the National Government as presently constituted". He was thus President in Hilary term 1939; the visiting Leo Amery described him in his diaries as "a pleasant youth".

As an undergraduate, Heath travelled widely in Europe. His opposition to appeasement was nourished by his witnessing first-hand a Nuremberg Rally in 1937, where he met leading Nazis Hermann Göring, Joseph Goebbels, and Heinrich Himmler at an SS cocktail party. He later described Himmler as "the most evil man I have ever met". He was in Germany for two months to learn German but did not keep up any fluency in the language in later life. In 1938 he visited Barcelona, then under attack from Spanish Nationalist forces during the Spanish Civil War. On one occasion a car in which he was travelling came under machine-gun fire, while on another a bomb hit his hotel whilst he was observing an air raid from outside. In the summer of 1939, accompanied by his Jewish friend Madron Seligman, he travelled to Danzig and Poland. They made the return journey by hitchhiking and rail across Germany through mobilising troops, returning to Britain just before the declaration of war.

Second World War
Heath spent late 1939 and early 1940 on a debating tour of the United States before being called up. On 22 March 1941, he received an emergency commission as a second lieutenant in the Royal Artillery. During the war he initially served with heavy anti-aircraft guns around Liverpool (which suffered heavy German bombing in May 1941) and by early 1942 was regimental adjutant, with the war substantive rank of captain.

Heath participated as an adjutant in the Normandy landings, where he met Maurice Schumann, French Foreign Minister under Pompidou. As a temporary major commanding a battery of his own, he provided artillery support during the Allied campaigns in France and Germany in 1944–45, for which he received a mention in despatches on 8 November 1945.

Heath later remarked that, although he did not personally kill anybody, as the British forces advanced he saw the devastation caused by his unit's artillery bombardments. In September 1945 he commanded a firing squad that executed a Polish soldier convicted of rape and murder. He was appointed a Member of the Order of the British Empire, Military Division (MBE) on 24 January 1946. He was demobilised in August 1946 and promoted to the substantive rank of lieutenant-colonel on 1 May 1947.

Heath joined the Honourable Artillery Company as a lieutenant-colonel on 1 September 1951, in which he remained active throughout the 1950s, rising to commanding officer of the Second Battalion; a portrait of him in full dress uniform still hangs in the HAC's Long Room. In April 1971, as prime minister, he wore his lieutenant-colonel's insignia to inspect troops.

Post-war, 1945–1950
Before the war, Heath had won a scholarship to Gray's Inn and had begun making preparations for a career at the Bar, but after the war he was placed in joint top position in the civil service examinations. He then became a civil servant in the Ministry of Civil Aviation (he was disappointed not to be posted to the Treasury, but declined an offer to join the Foreign Office, fearing that foreign postings might prevent him from entering politics).

Heath joined a team under Alison Munro tasked with drawing up a scheme for British airports using some of the many Second World War RAF bases, and was specifically charged with planning the home counties. Years later she attributed his evident enthusiasm for Maplin Airport to this work. Then much to the surprise of civil service colleagues, he sought adoption as the prospective parliamentary candidate for Bexley and resigned in November 1947.

After working as news editor of the Church Times from February 1948 to September 1949, Heath worked as a management trainee at the merchant bankers Brown, Shipley & Co. until his election as Member of Parliament (MP) for Bexley in the February 1950 general election. In the election he defeated an old contemporary from the Oxford Union, Ashley Bramall, by a margin of 133 votes.

Member of Parliament (1950–1965)

Heath made his maiden speech in the House of Commons on 26 June 1950, in which he appealed to the Labour government to participate in the Schuman Plan. As MP for Bexley, he gave enthusiastic speeches in support of the young candidate for neighbouring Dartford, Margaret Roberts, later Margaret Thatcher.

He was appointed as an opposition whip by Winston Churchill in February 1951. He remained in the whips' office after the Conservatives won the 1951 general election, rising rapidly to Joint Deputy Chief Whip, Deputy Chief Whip and, in December 1955, Government Chief Whip under Anthony Eden. Journalist Geoffrey Wheatcroft has observed that "Of all government jobs, this requires firmness and fairness allied to tact and patience and Heath's ascent seems baffling in hindsight".

Due to the convention that whips do not speak in Parliament, Heath managed to keep out of the controversy over the Suez Crisis. On the announcement of Eden's resignation, Heath submitted a report on the opinions of the Conservative MPs regarding Eden's possible successors. This report favoured Harold Macmillan and helped to secure Macmillan the premiership in January 1957. Macmillan later appointed Heath Minister of Labour, a Cabinet Minister—as Chief Whip Heath had attended Cabinet, but had not been formally a member—after winning the October 1959 election.

In 1960 Macmillan appointed Heath Lord Privy Seal with responsibility for the negotiations to secure the UK's first attempt to join the European Communities (or Common Market, as it was then more widely known). After extensive negotiations, involving detailed agreements about the UK's agricultural trade with Commonwealth countries such as New Zealand, British entry was vetoed by the French President, Charles de Gaulle, at a press conference in January 1963 – much to the disappointment of Heath, who was a firm supporter of European common market membership for the United Kingdom. He oversaw a successful application when serving as prime minister a decade later.

After this setback, a major humiliation for Macmillan's foreign policy, Heath was not a contender for the party leadership on Macmillan's retirement in October 1963. Under prime minister Sir Alec Douglas-Home he was President of the Board of Trade and Secretary of State for Industry, Trade and Regional Development, and oversaw the abolition of retail price maintenance.

Leader of the Opposition (1965–1970)

After the Conservative Party lost the general election of 1964, the defeated Home changed the party leadership rules to allow for a ballot by MPs and then resigned. The following year, Heath—who was Shadow Chancellor at the time, and had recently won favourable publicity for leading the fight against Labour's Finance Bill—unexpectedly won the party's leadership contest, gaining 150 votes to Reginald Maudling's 133 and Enoch Powell's 15. Heath became the Conservatives' youngest leader and retained office following the party's defeat in the general election of 1966.

In April 1968, Enoch Powell made his controversial "Rivers of Blood" speech, which criticised immigration to the United Kingdom. Soon afterwards, Heath telephoned Margaret Thatcher to inform her that he was going to sack Powell from the Shadow cabinet; she recalled that she "really thought that it was better to let things cool down for the present rather than heighten the crisis". The next day, Heath sacked Powell. Several Conservatives on the right protested against Powell's sacking. According to Heath, he never spoke to Powell again.

1970 election 
With another general election approaching in 1970 a Conservative policy document emerged from the Selsdon Park Hotel that offered free-market–oriented policies as solutions to the country's unemployment and inflation problems. Heath stated that the Selsdon weekend only reaffirmed policies that had actually been evolving since he became leader of the Conservative Party. The Labour prime minister, Harold Wilson, thought the document a vote-loser and dubbed it the product of Selsdon Man – after the supposedly prehistoric Piltdown Man – to portray it as reactionary. Heath's Conservative Party won the general election of 1970 with 330 seats to Labour's 287. The new cabinet included the future prime minister Margaret Thatcher (Education and Science), William Whitelaw (Leader of the House of Commons) and the former prime minister Alec Douglas-Home (Foreign and Commonwealth Affairs).

Prime minister (1970–1974)

Welfare state
During Heath's first year in office, higher charges were introduced for benefits of the welfare state such as school meals, spectacles, dentistry, and prescriptions. Entitlement to State Sickness Benefit was also changed so that it would only be paid after the first three days of sickness. As a result of the squeeze in the education budget, the provision of free school milk was ended for 8- to 11-year-olds (it had already been ended for older children by Harold Wilson); the tabloid press christened Margaret Thatcher, the then Education Secretary as "Margaret Thatcher: Milk Snatcher". Despite these measures, the Heath government encouraged a significant increase in welfare spending, and Thatcher blocked Macleod's other posthumous education policy: the abolition of the Open University, which had recently been founded by the preceding Labour government.

Provision was made under the 1970 National Insurance (Old Persons' and Widows' Pensions and Attendances Allowances) Act for pensions to be paid to old people who had been excluded from the pre-1948 pension schemes and were accordingly excluded from the comprehensive scheme that was introduced in 1948. About 100,000 people were affected by this change, half of whom were receiving Supplementary Benefit under the social security scheme. The Act also made improvements to the Widow's Pension scheme by introducing a scale that started at 30 shillings a week for women widowed at the age of 40 and rose to the full rate of £5 at the age of 50.

Considerable support was provided for nursery school building, and a long-term capital investment programme in school building was launched. A Family Fund was set up to assist families with children who had congenital conditions, while new benefits were introduced benefiting hundreds of thousands of disabled persons whose disabilities had been caused neither by war nor by industrial injury. An Attendance Allowance was introduced for those needing care at home, together with Invalidity Benefit for the long-term sick, while a higher Child Allowance was made available where invalidity allowance was paid. Widow's Benefits were introduced for those aged between forty and fifty years of age, improved subsidies for slum clearance were made available, while Rent Allowances were introduced for private tenants. In April 1971, the right to education was given to all children with Down's syndrome for the first time.

The school leaving age was raised to 16, while Family Income Supplement was introduced to boost the incomes of low-income earners.

Families who received this benefit were exempted from NHS charges while the children in such families were eligible for free school meals. Non-contributory pensions were also introduced for all persons aged eighty and above, while the Social Security Act 1973 was passed which introduced benefit indexation in the United Kingdom for the first time by index-linking benefits to prices to maintain their real value.

Scottish nationalism
Scottish nationalism grew as a political force, while the decimalisation of British coinage, begun under the previous Labour government, was completed eight months after Heath came to power. The Central Policy Review Staff was established by Heath in February 1971, while the Local Government Act 1972 changed the boundaries of the counties of England and Wales and created Metropolitan Counties around the major cities (e.g. Merseyside around Liverpool): this caused significant public anger. Heath did not divide England into regions, choosing instead to await the report of the Crowther Commission on the constitution; the 10 Government Office Regions were eventually set up by the Major government in 1994.

Economic policy
Chancellor of the Exchequer Iain Macleod died and was replaced on 20 July 1970 by Anthony Barber. Heath's planned economic policy changes (including a significant shift from direct to indirect taxation) remained largely unimplemented: the Selsdon policy document was more or less abandoned as unemployment increased considerably by 1972. By January that year, the number of unemployed reached a million, the highest level for more than two decades. Opposed to unemployment on moral grounds, Heath encouraged a famous "U-Turn" in economic policy that precipitated what became known as the "Barber Boom". This was a two-range process involving the budgets of 1972 and 1973, the former of which pumped £2.5 billion into the economy in increased pensions and benefits and tax reductions. By early 1974, as a result of this Keynesian economic strategy, unemployment had fallen to under 550,000. The economic boom did not last, and the Heath government implemented various cuts that led to the abandonment of policy goals such as a planned expansion of nursery education.

Trade unions
Much of the government's attention, as well as the media and public opinion, focused on deteriorating labour relations, as the government sought to weaken the economic power of the trade unions, which had grown steadily since 1945. The Industrial Relations Act 1971 set up a special court under the judge Lord Donaldson. Its imprisonment of striking dockworkers was a public relations disaster and became an object lesson for the Thatcher government of the 1980s. Thatcher relied instead on confiscating the assets of unions that courts found to have violated anti-strike laws.

The trade unions responded with a full-scale counterattack on a government hobbled by inflation and high unemployment. Especially damaging to the government's credibility were the two miners' strikes of 1972 and 1974, the latter of which resulted in much of the country's industry working a Three-Day Week in an attempt to conserve energy. The National Union of Mineworkers won its case but the energy shortages and the resulting breakdown of domestic consensus contributed to the eventual downfall of his government.

Unemployment
There was a steep rise in unemployment for the first two years of the Heath ministry, but it was then reversed. Labour in 1964 had inherited an unemployment count of around 400,000 but saw unemployment peak at 631,000 in early 1967. At election time in June 1970, the unemployment numbers were still high at 582,000. Heath and the Conservatives were pledged to "full employment" but within a year it became clear that they were losing that battle, as the official unemployment count crept towards 1,000,000 and some newspapers suggested that it was even higher. In January 1972 it was officially confirmed that unemployment had risen above 1,000,000 – a level not seen for more than 30 years. Various other reports around this time suggested that unemployment was higher still, with The Times newspaper claiming that "nearly 3,000,000" people were jobless by March of that year.

Foreign policy

Upon entering office in June 1970, Heath immediately set about trying to reverse Wilson's policy of ending Britain's military presence East of Suez. Heath took the United Kingdom into Europe on 1 January 1973, following passage in Parliament of the European Communities Act 1972 in October (21 Eliz. II c.68). He publicly supported the massive US bombing of Hanoi and Haiphong in April 1972.

His government quickly recognised the military regime of Augusto Pinochet in Chile and maintained good relations with it, despite the illegal nature of the Pinochet regime's coup d'état.

In October 1973 he placed a British arms embargo on all combatants in the Arab-Israeli Yom Kippur War, which mostly affected the Israelis by preventing them obtaining spares for their Centurion tanks. Heath refused to allow US intelligence gathering from British bases in Cyprus, resulting in a temporary halt in the US signals intelligence tap. He also refused permission for the US to use any British bases for resupply.

He favoured links with the People's Republic of China, visiting Mao Zedong in Beijing in 1974 and 1975 and remaining an honoured guest in China on frequent visits thereafter and forming a close relationship with Mao's successor Deng Xiaoping. Heath realised that to become closer to Europe he needed to be further from the United States, so he downplayed the Special Relationship that had long knitted the two nations together. The two nations differed on such major crises as Britain's EC membership, the Nixon economic "shocks" of 1971, the Bangladesh Liberation War, détente with Soviet Union, Kissinger's Year of Europe and the Middle East crisis of 1973.

Northern Ireland
Heath governed during a bloody period in the history of the Northern Ireland Troubles. On Bloody Sunday in 1972, 14 men and youths were shot dead by British soldiers during an anti-internment march in Derry City. In early 1971 Heath sent in a Secret Intelligence Service officer, Frank Steele, to talk to the IRA and find out what common ground there was for negotiations. Steele had carried out secret talks with Jomo Kenyatta ahead of the British withdrawal from Kenya. In July 1972, Heath permitted his Secretary of State for Northern Ireland, William Whitelaw, to hold unofficial talks in London with an IRA delegation by Seán Mac Stíofáin. In the aftermath of these unsuccessful talks, the Heath government pushed for a peaceful settlement with the political parties exclusively committed to non-violence.

The 1973 Sunningdale Agreement, which proposed a power-sharing deal, was strongly repudiated by many Unionists and the Ulster Unionist Party who withdrew its MPs at Westminster from the Conservative whip. The proposal was finally brought down by the Loyalist Ulster Workers' Council strike in 1974, by which time Heath was no longer in office.

Heath was targeted by the IRA for introducing internment in Northern Ireland. In December 1974, the Balcombe Street ASU threw a bomb onto the first-floor balcony of his home in Wilton Street, Belgravia where it exploded. Heath had been conducting a Christmas carol concert at Broadstairs and arrived home 10 minutes after the bomb exploded. No one was injured in the attack, but a landscape painted by Winston Churchill – given to Heath as a present – was damaged.

In January 2003, Heath gave evidence to the Saville Inquiry and stated that he had never sanctioned unlawful lethal force in Northern Ireland.

Fall from power

1974 general elections
Heath tried to bolster his government by calling a general election for 28 February 1974, using the election slogan "Who governs Britain?". The result of the election was inconclusive with no party gaining an overall majority in the House of Commons; the Conservatives had the most votes but Labour had slightly more seats. Heath began negotiations with Jeremy Thorpe, leader of the Liberal Party but, when these failed, he resigned as prime minister on 4 March 1974, and was replaced by Wilson's minority Labour government, eventually confirmed, though with a tiny majority, in a second election in October.

Rise of Thatcher
Heath came to be seen as a liability by many Conservative MPs, party activists and newspaper editors. His personality was considered cold and aloof, annoying even to his friends. Alan Watkins observed in 1991 that his "brusqueness, his gaucherie, his lack of small or indeed any talk, his sheer bad manners" were among the factors costing him the support of Conservative backbenchers in the subsequent Conservative leadership election.

He resolved to remain Conservative leader, even after losing the October 1974 general election, and at first it appeared that by calling on the loyalty of his front-bench colleagues he might prevail. In the weeks following the second election defeat, Heath came under tremendous pressure to concede a review of the rules and agreed to establish a commission to propose changes and to seek re-election. There was no clear challenger after Enoch Powell had left the party and Keith Joseph had ruled himself out after controversial statements implying that the working classes should be encouraged to use more birth control. Joseph's close friend and ally Margaret Thatcher, who believed that an adherent to the philosophy of the Centre for Policy Studies should stand, joined the leadership contest in his place alongside the outsider Hugh Fraser. Aided by Airey Neave's campaigning among backbench MPs — whose earlier approach to William Whitelaw had been rebuffed, out of loyalty to Heath — she emerged as the only serious challenger.

The new rules permitted new candidates to enter the ballot in a second round of voting should the first be inconclusive, so Thatcher's challenge was considered by some to be that of a stalking horse. Neave deliberately understated Thatcher's support to attract wavering votes from MPs who were keen to see Heath replaced even though they did not necessarily want Thatcher to replace him.

On 4 February 1975, Thatcher defeated Heath in the first ballot by 130 votes to 119, with Fraser coming in a distant third with 16 votes. This was not a big enough margin to give Thatcher the 15% majority necessary to win on the first ballot, but having finished in second place Heath immediately resigned and did not contest the next ballot. His favoured candidate, William Whitelaw, lost to Thatcher in the second vote one week later (Thatcher 146, Whitelaw 79, Howe 19, Prior 19, Peyton 11). The vote polarised along right-left lines, with in addition the region, experience and education of the MP having their effects. Heath and Whitelaw were stronger on the left, among Oxbridge and public school graduates, and in MPs from Northern England or Scotland.

Thatcher had promised Heath a seat in the Shadow Cabinet and planned to offer him whatever post he wanted. His advisors agreed he should wait at least six months, so he declined. He never relented and his refusal was called "the incredible sulk". Thatcher visited Heath at his home shortly after her election as leader and had to stay for coffee with his PPS Timothy Kitson so the waiting press would not realise how brief the visit had been. Heath claimed that he had simply declined her request for advice about how to handle the press, whilst Thatcher claimed that she offered him any Shadow Cabinet position he wanted and asked him to lead the Conservative campaign in the imminent EEC referendum, only to be rudely rebuffed.

Later career (1975–2001)

For many years, Heath persisted in criticism of the party's new ideological direction. At the time of his defeat, he was still popular with rank-and-file Conservative members and was warmly applauded at the 1975 Conservative Party Conference. He played a leading role in the 1975 referendum campaign in which the UK voted to remain part of the EEC, and he remained active on the international stage, serving on the Brandt Commission investigation into developmental issues, particularly on North–South projects (Brandt Report).

His relations with Thatcher remained poor, and in 1979–80, he turned down her offers of the positions of Ambassador to the United States and Secretary General of NATO. He continued as a central figure on the left of the party and, at the 1981 Conservative Party conference, openly criticised the government's economic policy of monetarism, which had seen inflation rise from 13% in 1979 to 18% in 1980 then fall to 4% by 1983, but had seen unemployment double from around 1.5 million to a postwar high of 3.3 million during that time.

In 1990, he flew to Baghdad to attempt to negotiate the release of aircraft passengers on British Airways Flight 149 and other British nationals taken hostage when Saddam Hussein invaded Kuwait. After the events of Black Wednesday in 1992, he stated in the House of Commons that government should build a fund of reserves to counter currency speculators.

In 1987, he was nominated in the election for the Chancellorship of the University of Oxford but lost to Roy Jenkins as a result of splitting the Conservative vote with Lord Blake.

Heath continued to serve as a backbench MP for the London constituency of Old Bexley and Sidcup and was, from 1992, the longest-serving MP ("Father of the House") and the oldest British MP. As Father of the House, he oversaw the election of two Speakers of the Commons, Betty Boothroyd and Michael Martin. Heath was created a Knight of the Garter on 23 April 1992. He retired from Parliament at the 2001 general election. Heath and Tony Benn were the last two serving MPs to have been elected during the reign of George VI, with Heath serving continuously since 1950.

Heath maintained business links with several companies including a Saudi think tank, two investment funds and a Chinese freight operator, mainly as an adviser on China or a member of the governing board. According to Chris Patten, the last Governor of Hong Kong, his commercial interests in China could have been one of the reasons why he denounced the democratic reforms introduced in the run-up to the handover of Hong Kong.

Parliament broke with precedent by commissioning a bust of Heath while he was still alive. Commentators  have noted how the statue of Margaret Thatcher appears to overshadow Heath's bust. The 1993 bronze work, by Martin Jennings, was moved to the Members' Lobby in 2002. On 29 April 2002, in his eighty-sixth year, he made a public appearance at Downing Street alongside the then–prime minister Tony Blair and the three other surviving former prime ministers at the time (James Callaghan, Margaret Thatcher and John Major), as well as relatives of deceased prime ministers, for a dinner which was part of the Golden Jubilee of Elizabeth II. This was to be one of his last public appearances, as the following year saw a decline in his health.

Personal life

Private residence

In the 1960s, Heath had lived in the Albany, off Piccadilly; at the unexpected end of his premiership, the French couple living there refused his demand that they move out so that he could have his flat back ("So much for European Unity!" Heath later wrote in his memoirs). For four months, Heath took the flat of Conservative MP Timothy Kitson; Kitson declined his offer to pay rent but later recalled an occasion when his own watch broke, and Heath in response invited him to take one of a large collection that he had been given on his travels. In July 1974, the Duke of Westminster, a major London landowner and ardent Europhile, allowed Heath to rent a property in Wilton Street, Belgravia, for an annual rent of £1,250 (just under £10,000 at 2014 prices), a tenth of the market value. The house had three storeys and a basement flat for Heath's housekeeper, and he continued to use it as his London home until old age prevented him from climbing the stairs.

In February 1985, Heath acquired a Wiltshire home, Arundells, in the Cathedral close at Salisbury, where he resided until his death twenty years later. In January 2006, it was announced that Heath had placed his house and contents, valued at £5 million in his will, in a charitable foundation, the Sir Edward Heath Charitable Foundation, to conserve the house as a museum to his career. The house is open to the public for guided tours from March to October; displayed therein is a large collection of personal effects as well as Heath's personal library, photo collections, and paintings by Winston Churchill.

In his will, Heath, who had no descendants, left only two legacies: £20,000 to his brother's widow, and £2,500 to his housekeeper.

Yachting
Heath was a keen yachtsman. He bought his first yacht Morning Cloud in 1969 and won the Sydney to Hobart Yacht Race that year. He captained Britain's winning team for the Admiral's Cup in 1971 – while prime minister – and also captained the team in the 1979 Fastnet race. He was a member of the Broadstairs Sailing Club, where he learnt to sail on a Snipe and a Fireball before moving on to success in larger boats.

Classical music
Heath maintained an interest in classical music as a pianist, organist and orchestral conductor, famously installing a Steinway grand in 10 Downing Street – bought with his £450 Charlemagne Prize money, awarded for his unsuccessful efforts to bring Britain into the EEC in 1963, and chosen on the advice of his friend, the pianist Moura Lympany – and conducting Christmas carol concerts in Broadstairs every year from his teens until old age. Heath often played the organ for services at Holy Trinity Brompton Church in his early years.

Heath conducted the London Symphony Orchestra, notably at a gala concert at the Royal Festival Hall in November 1971, at which he conducted Sir Edward Elgar's overture Cockaigne (In London Town). He also conducted the Royal Liverpool Philharmonic and the English Chamber Orchestra, as well as orchestras in Germany and the United States. During his premiership, Heath invited musician friends, such as Isaac Stern, Yehudi Menuhin, Clifford Curzon and the Amadeus Quartet, to perform either at Chequers or 10 Downing Street. Heath was the founding President of the European Community Youth Orchestra (in 1976), now the European Union Youth Orchestra.

In 1988, Heath recorded Beethoven's Triple Concerto, Op. 56 (with members of the Trio Zingara as soloists) and Boccherini's Cello Concerto in G major, G480.

Football
Heath was a supporter of the Lancashire football club Burnley, and just after the end of his term as prime minister in 1974 he opened the £450,000 Bob Lord Stand at the club's Turf Moor stadium.

Author

Heath wrote several books in the second half of the 1970s: Sailing, Music, and Travels. He also compiled a collection of carols called The Joy of Christmas, published in 1978 by Oxford University Press, which contained the music and lyrics to a wide variety of Christmas carols, each accompanied by a reproduction of a piece of religious art and a short introduction by Heath.

Heath's autobiography, The Course of My Life, appeared in 1998. According to his obituary in The Daily Telegraph, this "had involved dozens of researchers and writers (some of whom he never paid) over many years".

"Grocer Heath"
In 1964, despite substantial opposition from many Conservative MPs and independent grocers and shopkeepers, Heath led a successful fight to abolish resale price maintenance.

Private Eye, a satirical current affairs magazine, thereupon persistently ridiculed him as "Grocer Heath". The magazine also parodied him as the managing director of a struggling small company, "Heathco".

Sexuality
Heath never married. He had been expected to marry childhood friend Kay Raven, who was reportedly tired of waiting and married an RAF officer whom she met on holiday in 1950. In a four-sentence paragraph of his memoirs, Heath claimed that he had been too busy establishing a career after the war and had "perhaps ... taken too much for granted". In a 1998 TV interview with Michael Cockerell, Heath said that he had kept her photograph in his flat for many years afterwards.

His interest in music kept him on friendly terms with female musicians, including pianist Moura Lympany. When Heath was prime minister she was approached by the Conservative MP Tufton Beamish, who said: "Moura, Ted must get married. Will you marry him?" She said she would have done but was in love with someone else. She later said the most intimate thing Heath had done was to put his arm around her shoulder.

Bernard Levin wrote at the time in The Observer that the UK had to wait until the emergence of the permissive society for a prime minister who was a virgin. In later life, according to his official biographer Philip Ziegler, at dinner parties Heath was "apt to relapse into morose silence or completely ignore the woman next to him and talk across her to the nearest man"; others at the time claimed Heath was just not talkative at parties.

Heath's status as a bachelor led to speculations and rumours, some quite wild, about his private life. The public assumed that he was "queer". There were many innuendos in Private Eye about it and homophobic chants could be heard outside Downing Street during protests by trade unionists against his Industrial Relations Bill.

John Campbell, who published a biography of Heath in 1993, devoted four pages to a discussion of the evidence concerning Heath's sexuality. While acknowledging that Heath was often assumed by the public to be gay, not least because it is "nowadays ... whispered of any bachelor", he found "no positive evidence" that this was so "except for the faintest unsubstantiated rumour" (the footnote refers to a mention of a "disturbing incident" at the beginning of the Second World War in a 1972 biography by Andrew Roth). Campbell ultimately concluded that the most significant aspect of Heath's sexuality was his complete repression of it.

Brian Coleman, the Conservative Party London Assembly member for Barnet and Camden, claimed in 2007 that Heath, to protect his career, had stopped cottaging in the 1950s. Coleman said it was "common knowledge" among Conservatives that Heath had been given a stern warning by police when he underwent background checks for the post of privy councillor. Heath's biographer Philip Ziegler wrote in 2010 that Coleman was able to provide "little or no information" to back up this statement, that no man had ever claimed to have had a sexual relationship with Heath, nor was any trace of homosexuality to be found in his papers, and that "those who knew him well" insist that he had no such inclination. He believes Heath to have been asexual, although he does mention a letter from one "Freddy", who seems hurt that "Teddie" had spurned his advances (Chapter 2 of his book).

Lord Armstrong of Ilminster, who was Heath's friend and former private secretary, stated his belief that Heath was asexual, saying that he "never detected a whiff of sexuality in relation to men, women or children." Another friend and confidant, Sara Morrison, former vice-chairman of the Conservative Party, said Heath had "effectively" told her "that he was sexless". Charles Moore, in his authorised biography of Margaret Thatcher, said that Bill Deedes believed that Thatcher "seem[ed] convinced" Heath was gay, whilst Moore believed it is "possible" that Thatcher's reference, in interview in 1974, to Heath not having a family, was a deliberate hint that he was gay, in order to discredit him. Thatcher certainly seems to have disliked Heath. "When I look at him and he looks at me," she once remarked, according to Ziegler (Chapter 4), "it doesn't feel like a man looking at a woman, more like a woman looking at another woman."

When he moved to Arundells in 1985, Heath hired Derek Frost, life partner of Jeremy Norman, to modernise and redecorate the house in Salisbury. He became friends with the couple, though never close. When they asked Heath why he had not supported homosexual law reform (he was either absent from the debates in the 1960s or voted against Lord Arran's first Bill in May 1965), he replied that he had always been in favour but that "the rank and file of the party would never have stood for it." Norman's view is that Heath was "a deeply closeted gay man" who "decided early in life to sublimate his sexuality to his political ambitions." In later life, Heath voted for the lowering of the age of same-sex consent to eighteen and then sixteen.

Similarly, Michael McManus, who was Heath's private secretary in the 1990s and helped with his memoirs, writes in his book on gay conservative politicians that he "was left in no doubt whatsoever that Heath was a gay man who had sacrificed his personal life to his political career, exercising iron self-control and living a celibate existence as he climbed the 'greasy pole' of preferment."

Allegations of child sexual abuse

In April 2015, a rape claim against Heath was investigated by the Metropolitan Police but was dropped. In August 2015, several police forces were investigating allegations of child sexual abuse by Heath. Hampshire, Jersey, Kent, Wiltshire, Gloucestershire and Thames Valley constabularies and London's Metropolitan Police investigated such claims. It was reported that a man had claimed that at the age of 12 years he had been raped by Heath in a Mayfair flat in 1961, after he had run away from home. Allegations about Heath were investigated as part of Operation Midland, the Metropolitan Police inquiry into claims of historic child abuse and related homicides. A witness called "Nick" was introduced to the police by the former Exaro website, who had asked him about alleged child sexual abuse by prominent figures at the Dolphin Square apartment complex in Pimlico, London; Heath was reported to be one of the figures. In 2018 "Nick", whose real name is Carl Beech, was arrested and charged over child pornography offences and in January 2019 he pleaded guilty. Beech, who had fabricated allegations against Heath and other prominent politicians and civil servants, was sentenced in July 2019 to eighteen years in prison.

Also in August 2015, Sky News reported that Jersey police were investigating allegations against Heath as part of Operation Whistle, and a similar investigation, Operation Conifer, was launched by Wiltshire Police at the same time. The Sir Edward Heath Charitable Foundation, which operates the museum at Arundells, his home in Salisbury, said it welcomed the investigation. In November 2016, criminologist Richard Hoskins said that the evidence used against Heath in Operation Conifer, including discredited allegations of satanic ritual abuse, was "preposterous", "fantastical" and gained through the "controversial" practice of recovered-memory therapy. Operation Conifer was closed in March 2017, having cost a reported £1.5 million over two years, as no corroborating evidence had been found in any of the 42 allegations by 40 individuals (including three different names used by one person).

In September 2017, it was announced that the Independent Inquiry into Child Sexual Abuse would review the police investigation into Heath. Police said that if Heath were still alive they would have interviewed him under caution in relation to seven out of the 42 allegations, but nothing should be inferred about his guilt or innocence. In his summary report, Chief Constable Mike Veale confirmed that "no further corroborative evidence was found" to support the satanic abuse claims.

Illness and death

In August 2003, at the age of 87, Heath suffered a pulmonary embolism while on holiday in Salzburg, Austria. He never fully recovered, and owing to his declining health and mobility made very few public appearances in the last two years of his life, his last one was at the unveiling of a set of gates at St Paul's Cathedral dedicated to Churchill on 30 November 2004.

In his final public statement, Heath paid tribute to James Callaghan, who died on 26 March 2005, saying "James Callaghan was a major fixture in the political life of this country during his long and varied career. When in opposition he never hesitated to put firmly his party's case. When in office he took a smoother approach towards his supporters and opponents alike. Although he left the House of Commons in 1987 he continued to follow political life and it was always a pleasure to meet with him. We have lost a major figure from our political landscape."

Just under four months later, Sir Edward Heath died at his home from pneumonia at 7.30pm on 17 July 2005, at the age of 89. He was cremated on 25 July 2005 at a funeral service attended by 1,500 people. On the day after his death, the BBC Parliament channel showed the BBC results coverage of the 1970 election. A memorial service was held for Heath in Westminster Abbey on 8 November 2005, which was attended by 2,000 people. Three days later his ashes were interred in Salisbury Cathedral. In a tribute to him, the then–prime minister Tony Blair stated "He was a man of great integrity and beliefs he held firmly from which he never wavered".

Heath ministry

Honours

Edward Heath received several accolades and honours.

Coat of arms

Honorary degrees
Heath was awarded many honorary degrees for his Service to the United Kingdom and the Commonwealth. These include:

Foreign honours
 Bangladesh Liberation War Honour (Bangladesh Muktijuddho Sanmanona)

Books by Heath

References

Further reading

Biographies of Heath
 Campbell, John. Edward Heath: A Biography. London: Jonathan Cape, 1993.
 Garnett, Mark. "Edward Heath, 1965–70 and 1974–75" in Leaders of the opposition: from Churchill to Cameron ed. by Timothy Heppell. (Palgrave Macmillan, 2012), pp 80–96.
 Hennessey, Peter. The Prime Minister: The Office and Its Holders Since 1945 (2001) pp. 331–356.
 Hurd, Douglas. "Heath, Sir Edward Richard George (1916–2005)", Oxford Dictionary of National Biography Oxford University Press, Jan 2009; online edn, September 2012. Retrieved 1 September 2013.
 McManus, Michael. Edward Heath: A Singular Life (2016).
 MacShane, Denis, Heath (British Prime Ministers of the 20th Century) (2006) (excerpt and text search)
 Ziegler, Philip, Edward Heath: The Authorised Biography, Harper Press, 2010;  excerpt and text search

Politics and domestic policy
 Ball, Stuart, and Anthony Seldon, eds. The Heath Government: 1970–1974: A Reappraisal (London: Longman, 1996) 423pp.
 Beckett, Andy. When The Lights Went Out: What Really Happened to Britain in the Seventies (2010)
 Blake, Robert. The Conservative Party from Peel to Major (Faber & Faber, 2012) pp. 299–220.
 Butler, David E. et al. The British General Election of 1970 (1971)
 Butler, David E. et al. The British General Election of February 1974 (1975)
 Butler, David E. et al. The British General Election of October 1974 (1975)
 Cowley, Philip; Bailey, Matthew. "Peasants' Uprising or Religious War? Re-examining the 1975 Conservative Leadership Contest," British Journal of Political Science (2000) 30#4 pp. 599–630 in JSTOR
 Dunton, Mark. "Probing the 1970s: A Case Study: Inflation, Public Relations, and the Heath Administration, 1972." Archives: The Journal of the British Records Association 38.126 (2013): 28–39.
 Foster, John. "Upper Clyde Shipbuilders 1971–2 and Edward Heath's U-turn: How a united workforce defeated a divided government." Mariner's Mirror 102#1 (2016): 34–48.
 Heppell, Timothy. Choosing the Tory Leader: Conservative Party Leadership Elections from Heath to Cameron (IB Tauris, 2007).
 Heppell, Timothy, and Michael Hill. "Prime ministerial powers of patronage: ministerial appointments and dismissals under Edward Heath." Contemporary British History 29.4 (2015): 464–485.
 Holmes, Martin. The Failure of the Heath Government  (2nd ed. 1997) excerpt and text search
 Holmes, Martin. Political pressure and economic policy: British government 1970–1974 (1982) excerpt.
 Hughes, Rosaleen Anne. Governing in hard times': the Heath government and civil emergencies–the 1972 and the 1974 miners' strikes." (Dissertation, Queen Mary University of London; 2012) online.
 Hurd, Douglas. An end to promises: sketch of a government, 1970–1974 (1976)
 Lockwood, Charles. "‘Action Not Words’: The Conservative Party, Public Opinion and ‘Scientific’ Politics, c. 1945–70." Twentieth Century British History 31.3 (2020): 360-386.
 Moore, Charles.  Margaret Thatcher: From Grantham to the Falklands (2013)
 Pearce, Robert. "Bad Blood: Powell, Heath and the Tory party." History Today (April 2008), 58#4 pp 33–39.
 Pentland, Gordon. "Edward Heath, the Declaration of Perth and the Scottish Conservative and Unionist Party, 1966–70." Twentieth Century British History 26#2 (2015): 249–273.
 Ramsden, J. The winds of change: Macmillan to Heath, 1957–1975 (1996), Volume 5 of the History of the Conservative Party.
 Roe-Crines, Andrew S., and Timothy Heppell, eds. Policies and Politics Under Prime Minister Edward Heath (2020) excerpt
 Sandbrook, Dominic. State of Emergency The Way We Were Britain 1970–1974 (2010) 755pp
 Smith, Jeremy. "‘Walking a Real Tight-rope of Difficulties’: Sir Edward Heath and the Search for Stability in Northern Ireland, June 1970 – March 1971," Twentieth Century British History (2007) 18#2 pp 219–253.
 Turner, Alwyn W. Crisis? What Crisis?: Britain in the 1970s (2009), how the popular culture handled political issues
 Watkins, Alan. A Conservative Coup. London: Duckworth, 1991 
 Young, Hugo and Goodman, Geoffrey. "The Trade Unions and the Fall of the Heath Government," Contemporary Record (1988) 1#4 pp 36–46.

Foreign and defence policy
 Benvenuti, Andrea. "The Heath Government and British Defence Policy in Southeast Asia at the End of Empire (1970–71)," Twentieth Century British History 20#1 (2009), 53–73.
 Brummer, Justin Adam. "Anglo-American relations and the EC enlargement, 1969–1974' (PhD dissertation, University College London, 2012) online
 Hamai, Yumiko. "‘Imperial Burden’ or ‘Jews of Africa’?: An Analysis of Political and Media Discourse in the Ugandan Asian Crisis (1972)." Twentieth Century British History 22.3 (2011): 415-436.
 Hughes, R. Gerald, and Thomas Robb. "Kissinger and the Diplomacy of Coercive Linkage in the 'Special Relationship' between the United States and Great Britain, 1969–1977." Diplomatic History''' 37.4 (2013): 861–905.
 Hynes, Catherine. The Year That Never Was: Heath, the Nixon Administration, and the Year of Europe (University College Dublin Press, 2009).
 Jeffrey, Samuel Robert. "A Most Divisive Year: The Year of Europe and the Special Relationship in 1973" (Thesis, Vanderbilt University History Dept., 2016) online  bibliography pp. 133–146.
 Langlois, Laëtitia. "Edward Heath and the Europeanisation of Englishness: The Hopes and Failures of a European English Leader," in Englishness revisited ed. by Floriane Reviron-Piégay. (Newcastle upon Tyne: Cambridge Scholars, 2009), pp. 174–88
 Leonard, Dick. "Edward Heath—Cheerleader for Europe." in Leonard, A Century of Premiers (Palgrave Macmillan UK, 2005). 263–281.
 Lord, Christopher. British Entry to the European Community under the Heath Government, 1970–74 (1993) p. 194
 Mockli, Daniel. European foreign policy during the Cold War: Heath, Brandt, Pompidou and the dream of political unity (IB Tauris, 2008).
 Novak, Andrew. "Averting an African Boycott: British Prime Minister Edward Heath and Rhodesian Participation in the Munich Olympics," Britain and the World (2013) 6#1 pp 27–47 DOI:10.3366/brw.2013.0076
 Parr, Helen. "The British Decision to Upgrade Polaris, 1970–4," Contemporary European History (2013) 22#2 pp. 253–274.
 Parr, Helen. "‘The Nuclear Myth’: Edward Heath, Europe, and the International Politics of Anglo-French Nuclear Co-Operation 1970–3." International History Review 35#3 (2013): 534–555.
 Patterson, Henry. "The border security problem and Anglo-Irish relations 1970–1973." Contemporary British History 26.2 (2012): 231–251.
 Robb, Thomas. "Antelope, Poseidon or a Hybrid: The Upgrading of the British Strategic Nuclear Deterrent, 1970-1974." Journal of Strategic Studies (2010) 33#6 pp 797–817
 Robb, Thomas. "The Power of Oil: Edward Heath, the ‘Year of Europe’ and the Anglo-American ‘Special Relationship’", Contemporary British History (2012) 26#1 pp. 73–96. on 1974
 Rossbach, Niklas H. Heath, Nixon and the Rebirth of the Special Relationship: Britain, the US and the EC, 1969–74 (2009) excerpt and text search
 Scott, Andrew. Allies apart: Heath, Nixon and the Anglo-American relationship (Palgrave Macmillan, 2011) 272 pp
 Smith, Simon C. "Coming Down on the Winning Side: Britain and the South Asia Crisis, 1971." Contemporary British History 24.4 (2010): 451–470.
 Spelling, Alex. "Edward Heath and Anglo-American Relations 1970–1974: A Reappraisal," Diplomacy & Statecraft (2009) 20, Number 4, pp. 638–658.
 Spelling, Alex. "‘Recrimination and reconciliation’: Anglo-American relations and the Yom Kippur War." Cold War History 13.4 (2013): 485-506.
 Stoddart, Kristan. "The Heath Government, France, and the Not So Special Relationship, 1970–1974." in Stoddart, The Sword and the Shield: Britain, America, NATO and Nuclear Weapons, 1970–1976  (Palgrave Macmillan UK, 2014) pp. 11–42.

Historiography
 Holmes, Martin. The Failure of the Heath Government  (2nd ed. 1997) excerpt and text search pp ix to xx.

External links

 
 Obituary, The Guardian (London). Retrieved 9 December 2014.
 Sir Edward Heath chronology, badley.info. Retrieved 9 December 2014.
 Profile of Arundells, Sir Edward Heath's home, arundells.org. Retrieved 9 December 2014.
 
 
  
 Edward Heath interview on BBC Radio 4 Desert Island Discs'', 23 December 1988

Bronze bust of Sir Edward Heath in the UK Parliamentary Collections

|-

|-

 
1916 births
2005 deaths
20th-century English memoirists
20th-century English musicians
20th-century prime ministers of the United Kingdom
20th-century classical musicians
21st-century English musicians
21st-century classical musicians
Alumni of Balliol College, Oxford
British Anglicans
British Army personnel of World War II
British Secretaries of State
Burials at Salisbury Cathedral
Conservative Party (UK) MPs for English constituencies
Conservative Party prime ministers of the United Kingdom
English Anglicans
English classical organists
English male sailors (sport)
English non-fiction writers
Honourable Artillery Company officers
Deaths from pneumonia in England
Knights of the Garter
Leaders of the Opposition (United Kingdom)
Leaders of the Conservative Party (UK)
Lords Privy Seal
British male organists
Members of the Order of the British Empire
Members of the Privy Council of the United Kingdom
Ministers in the Eden government, 1955–1957
Ministers in the Macmillan and Douglas-Home governments, 1957–1964
Ministers in the third Churchill government, 1951–1955
Musicians from Kent
People educated at Chatham House Grammar School
People from Broadstairs
People from Salisbury
Politicians awarded knighthoods
Presidents of the Board of Trade
Presidents of the Oxford Union
Presidents of the Oxford University Conservative Association
Prime Ministers of the United Kingdom
Royal Artillery officers
Snipe class sailors
UK MPs 1950–1951
UK MPs 1951–1955
UK MPs 1955–1959
UK MPs 1959–1964
UK MPs 1964–1966
UK MPs 1966–1970
UK MPs 1970–1974
UK MPs 1974
UK MPs 1974–1979
UK MPs 1979–1983
UK MPs 1983–1987
UK MPs 1987–1992
UK MPs 1992–1997
UK MPs 1997–2001
20th-century British male musicians
Operation Overlord
Military personnel from Kent
Shadow Chancellors of the Exchequer
Male classical organists